Rim Glacier is a glacier, 10 km long and 2 km wide, flowing north from the polar plateau in a deep valley between Robinson Peak and Mount Vishniac into Mackay Glacier, Victoria Land. The name alludes to the use of a bicycle as a practical means of transportation by a glacial mapping party led by Trevor Chinn, summer season 1992–93, and is part of a theme of cycling names in the area. Approved by New Zealand Geographic Board (NZGB) in 1995.
 

Glaciers of Victoria Land
Scott Coast